Angelina Pagano (1888–1962) was an Argentine stage and film actress. Pagano appeared in eighteen films, but was best known for her stage acting and work as a theatre director.

Selected filmography
 A Doll's House (1943)
 The Prodigal Woman (1945)
 Madame Bovary (1947)

References

Bibliography 
 Finkielman, Jorge. The Film Industry in Argentina: An Illustrated Cultural History. McFarland, 24 Dec 2003.

External links 
 

1888 births
1962 deaths
Argentine stage actresses
Argentine film actresses
20th-century Argentine actresses
People from Buenos Aires